The EuroDeaf 2015, short for the 2015 European Deaf Football Championships, is the eight edition of the European competition of deaf football national teams for men, and the second edition for women. It was organized by the European Deaf Sport Organization (EDSO), and was held in Hanover, Germany between 14 and 27 June 2015.  16 men's national teams and 4 women's national teams competed first in the group stage and subsequently in knock-out stage. In the men's championship, Turkey won the title for the first time, defeating Russia in the final, Great Britain placed third. In the women's championship, Russia won the title for the second time, defeating Germany in the final, Poland placed third.

Participating nations
Men

Women

References

2015
International association football competitions hosted by Germany
2015 in disability sport
2015 in association football
June 2015 sports events in Europe
2015–16 in German football
2015–16 in European football
June 2015 sports events in Germany
Sport in Hanover